Slavko Pavletić (15 April 1914– 27 May 1945) was a Croatian footballer who played as a midfielder for Meteor Zagreb and Concordia Zagreb.

International career
He made his debut for Croatia under the flag of the Independent State of Croatia, a World War II-era puppet state of Nazi Germany, in a September 1941 friendly match against Slovakia and earned a total of 4 caps, scoring 2 goals. His final international was a November 1942 friendly against Nazi Germany.

References

Externbal links
 Profile - Croatian Football Federation 

1917 births
1945 deaths
Footballers from Zagreb
Association football defenders
Croatian footballers
Croatia international footballers
HŠK Concordia players
People executed by Yugoslavia
Executed Croatian people
Croatian civilians killed in World War II